Ronald Allen White (born January 27, 1961) is the Chief United States district judge of the United States District Court for the Eastern District of Oklahoma.

Education and career

Born in Sapulpa, Oklahoma, White received a Bachelor of Arts degree from the University of Oklahoma in 1983 and a Juris Doctor from the University of Oklahoma College of Law in 1986. He was in private practice in Tulsa, Oklahoma, from 1986 to 2003.

Federal judicial service

On May 15, 2003,  White was nominated by President George W. Bush to a seat on the United States District Court for the Eastern District of Oklahoma vacated by Frank Howell Seay. White was confirmed by the United States Senate on September 30, 2003, and received his commission on October 2, 2003. He became Chief Judge in 2017.

Notable case

On September 30, 2014, White ruled that the Affordable Care Act subsidies should not be made available in states that did not choose to set up their own health care exchanges. His opinion was noteworthy, as he became the first federal judge to rule on the issue after two different appeals courts issued conflicting rulings. He interacts with both rulings in his own opinion.

References

Sources

1961 births
Living people
Judges of the United States District Court for the Eastern District of Oklahoma
United States district court judges appointed by George W. Bush
21st-century American judges
People from Sapulpa, Oklahoma
University of Oklahoma alumni
University of Oklahoma College of Law alumni